Benedict Broutchoux (7 November 1879 – 2 June 1944) was a French anarchist opposed to the reformist Émile Basly during a strike in the north of France, in 1902.

Further reading 

 
 Phil Casoar, Stéphane Callens, Les aventures épatantes et véridiques de Benoît Broutchoux, Humeurs Noires - Centre Culturel Libertaire de Lille, Alternative Libertaire Belgique (Brussels), 1993, .

References
 Broutchoux in the EnDehors newspaper

1879 births
1944 deaths
People from Saône-et-Loire
French anarchists
Members of the General Confederation of Labour (France)